The Spirit of London Awards is an awards ceremony that awards young people for their talent across London and the UK, in the arts, media, sport, campaigning and education. The project was created by the Damilola Taylor Trust in 2009 as a way of addressing the imbalance young people are portrayed by the national media by creating a Community Oscars for young people to rival the MOBO Awards and the BAFTAs. SOLA is also a youth movement aimed at decreasing crime by young people, decreasing poverty and ensuring every young person reaches their potential. They do this by working in conjunction with the Greater London Authority, local government and Parliament.

Supporters include David Cameron PM, Frank Warren, Leona Lewis, Brooke Kinsella, Noel Clarke, Diversity, Boris Johnson and Rio Ferdinand. It is supported by Barclays, The Sun, Team GB, Kiss 100, Working Links, PlayStation and many other organizations  and companies.

The first Spirit of London Awards was held on 27 November 2009, at the Alexander Palace in London. The second awards took place 27 November 2010, at The O2 Arena IndigO2 in London. The 2011 awards took place at the Royal Albert Hall on 20 November 2011 and the 2012 awards took place on 10 December 2012 at The O2 Arena.

Before each awards night there is a reception at 10 Downing Street so the short-listed nominees can meet the Prime Minister of the United Kingdom. The Prime Ministers to have greeted and congratulated the nominees so far are Gordon Brown and David Cameron.

Downing Street reception 

Approximately two weeks before the awards night the three nominees in each category, the sponsors of the event and performers on the night get a chance to meet each other at 10 Downing Street before the Prime Minister of the United Kingdom delivers a speech.

SOLA School Roadshow 

Previous nominees along with a celebrity ambassador go to secondary schools all over London to speak to the students about their experiences. There is also a Q&A at the end when students can ask questions.

In 2012 the roadshow went to over 20 schools in London.

Youth manifesto 

In 2012 using the collection of ideas from 140 young ambassadors of SOLA and other young people around London's  most disadvantaged areas a youth manifesto was created which delivers ideas on how the government can effectively engage young people in the UK. It was written by 23-year-old Oliver Hypolite-Bishop who also wrote Siobhan Benita's manifesto for the 2012 London mayoral election.  It was presented to David Cameron, Nick Clegg and Ed Miliband on 29 November 2012.

Award categories 

Each category has three nominees shortlisted. (Sometimes one more is added in special circumstances.)

 Community Champions Award - Young people who strive through their endeavors and positive actions to make their mark on their local community.
 London Legend Award - The award goes to the iconic Londoner who young people feel deserves recognition for their role in promoting London positively on the world stage.
 Young Heroes Award (Mayor's Order of Merit) - An award for special kids whose special deeds have made a difference to their local community. 
 Achievement Through Sport Award - For young people who either excel themselves against the odds or who use sport to help others in the community.
 Achievement Through Music Award - Young people who use their ability with music to progress in life or to brighten up the lives of others in their communities.
 Community Business Entrepreneur Award - This award is for a young person or group of young people who light their local community with their enterprise through business.
 Achievement Through Education Award - An important award category and one which will be awarded not necessarily to an individual but perhaps to a class of young people who have excelled together and brightened up their local community in doing so.
 Achievement Through The Arts Award - An awards category for those that make their mark creatively in the arts world - film, television, theater, literature and then light up the world for others in doing so.
 Special Recognition Award - This award is made for outstanding contribution to charity campaigning.

2012 awards

The awards ceremony on 10 December was held at The O2 Arena in Greenwich. The hosts for this event were Emily Atack and Russell Kane; the confirmed line up performing on the night included Labrinth, Maverick Sabre, Stooshe, McFly, Noisettes, YolanDa Brown, Diversity and Angel.

The submissions for each category this year averaged 3000 nominations.

The Spirit of London Awards will become the biggest ever youth event with an 8000-seater audience celebrating the young people of the UK.

2011 awards 
The awards were held on 20 November 2011. The event was at The Royal Albert Hall and was hosted by Stacey Solomon and Eddie Kadi.

Performers on the night included Tinchy Stryder, Beverley Knight, DJ Fresh, Diversity and Keri Hilson.

Class of 2011

Achievement through music

 David o'Connell - Winner
 Miranda Gunn - Shortlisted
 J - Sol - Shortlisted

Achievement through education
 Alexandros Pamnani - Winner
 Kay-Jay Simmons - Shortlisted
 Jamal Walker - Shortlisted

Achievement through media
 Bobby Jenkins - Winner
 Creative Nerds - Dirujan Sabesan & Sam Thornton - Shortlisted	
 Courtney Dionne Carr - Shortlisted

Community champions
 HYPE - Winner
 Barking & Dagenham young inspectors - Shortlisted
 Horizons ShoutOut Council - Shortlisted

Young business entrepreneur
 Jude Samuel Escol - Winner
 Jahmila Connage - Shortlisted
 Jessica Rose - Shortlisted

Achievement through the arts
 Antoinette Rita Opeyemi - Winner
 Torron-Lee Dewar - Shortlisted
 Fabien Soazandry - Shortlisted

Achievement through sport

 Pechkam BMX Club - Winner
 Mauro Vilhete - Shortlisted
 Darius Knight - Shortlisted

Young hero
 
 Lucas Pinto - Winner 
 Louis French - Shortlisted
 Cynthia Masiyiwa - Shortlisted

Achievement through fashion
 Jessica Anuna - Winner	
 Jada Simone - Shortlisted
 Nicholas Amfo - Shortlisted

Young campaigner of the year
 Callum Fairhurst - Shortlisted
 Eliza Reberio - Shortlisted
 Jahanara Chaudhry - Shortlisted

London legend
 Harry Redknapp - Winner

2010 awards 
The awards were held 27 November 2010. This year's event was held at the IndigO2 in Greenwich, and was hosted by Tamar Hussan (Clash of the Titans) and Tasha Danvers (Olympic bronze medalist in 400m hurdles).

The supporting cast included such acts as Toploader, Roll Deep, Labrinth, Robbie Craig, Diversity, and Alexandra Burke.

Class of 2010 
 Vanessa Sanyauke (Rafiki Network) - Won Community Champions Award
 Nutmeg - Shortlisted for the Community Champions Award
 Bigga Fish Street Team - Shortlisted for the Community Champions Award
 Prendergast Ladywellfields College - Won Young Heroes Award
 Supakids - Shortlisted for the Young Heroes Award
 Joshua Sukama - Shortlisted for Young Heroes Award
 Jessica Elliott (Dancing After School) - Won Community Business Entrepreneur Award 
 Omar Choudhry - Shortlisted for the Community Business Entrepreneur Award
 Sabirul Islam - Shortlisted for the Community Business Entrepreneur Award
 Hayley Rea (Aim High Dance Academy) - Won Achievement Through The Arts Award 
 Big Deal Youth Arts Company - Shortlisted for the Achievement Through The Arts Award
 Alice Moore - Shortlisted for the Achievement Through The Arts Award
 Camara Fearon - Won Achievement Through Music Award 
 Clarence 'Poetic Preacher' Jackson - Shortlisted for the Achievement Through Music Award
 SwiftKnight - Shortlisted for the Achievement Through Music Award
 Robert Hughes - Won Achievement Through Sport Award
 Ryan Jones - Shortlisted for the Achievement Through Sport Award
 Chloe Spiteri - Shortlisted for the Achievement Through Sport Award
 Bobby Kensah - Won Achievement Through Education Award
 Nathan Ghann - Shortlisted for the Achievement Through Education Award
 Jesse Andrews & Jessie Brock - Shortlisted for the Achievement Through Education Award
 Dennis Gyamfi (Endz2Endz) - Won Achievement Through Media Award
 The Exposure Team - Shortlisted for the Achievement Through Media Award
 Raphael Oyelade - Shortlisted for the Achievement Through Media Award
 Barbara Windsor - Won London Legend Award

2009 awards

In attendance were distinguished celebrities such as Sir Michael Caine, JLS, Tasha Danvers, and Tamar Hassan, the majority of the mayors from the 33 London boroughs, senior executives from various sponsors, and notable government officials.

The show was hosted by Brooke Kinsella and Lemar. There were performances by Alexandra Burke, DJ Ironik, and Diversity to name but a few who gave their time for free to celebrate the young people.

Class of 2009 
 Daniel De Gale - Won the Special Recognition Award
 Nathan Storey - Won the Young Heroes Award
 The Silvester Cousins - Shortlisted for the Young Heroes Award
 Thomas Robertson - Shortlisted for the Young Heroes Award
 Steve Jones - Shortlisted for the Young Heroes Award
 Dean Atta - Won the Achievement Through the Arts Award
 Islington Youth Theatre - Shortlisted for the Achievement Through the Arts Award
 SuperArts Dancers - Shortlisted for the Achievement Through the Arts Award
 Ebonie Reid-Barlow - Won the Achievement Through Education Award
 Tommy Williams - Shortlisted for the Achievement Through Education Award
 Michael Adewale -  Shortlisted for the Achievement Through Education Award.
 Kolor Skeme - Won the Community Business Entrepreneur Award
 MBG Funhouse - Shortlisted for the Community Business Entrepreneur Award
 The Cordless Show Team - Shortlisted for the Community Business Entrepreneur Award
 The Respect Team - Won the Community Champions Award
 Ascension Eagles Senior Coed Team - Shortlisted for the Community Champions Award
 Burntwood School Envision Team - Shortlisted for the Community Champions Award
 Mariama Samba - Won the Achievement Through Music Award
 Frances Davies - Shortlisted for the Achievement Through Music Award
 Matthew Haynes - Shortlisted for the Achievement Through Music Award
 Liam O'Brien (aka Ritz) - Shortlisted for the Achievement Through Music Award
 Marlon Mellish - Won the Achievement Through Sport Award
 Sean Safo - Shortlisted for the Achievement Through Sport Award
 Jack Booth - Shortlisted for the Achievement Through Sport Award
  Sir Michael Caine - Won the London Legend Award

References

Award ceremonies in the United Kingdom
Events in London
London awards
Articles containing video clips